9 Avenue North is a planned and approved CTrain light rail station in Calgary, Alberta, Canada part of the Green Line. Construction is expected to begin in 2024 and complete in 2027 as part of construction stage one, phase two.

The station will be between 9 Avenue N and 7 Avenue N in the inner-city community of Crescent Heights. It is planned to be a low-profile urban station with curb height platforms, at-grade boarding, and will be in the median of Centre Street. The design will be smaller in scale than other Green Line stations, with narrow side-loading platforms to reflect the character of the surrounding community, and due to a constrained public realm. It will not include a park and ride. The station is surrounded by a low density residential area, local shops, Rotary Park, and is a three-minute walk from the McHugh Bluff lookout point, offering panoramic vistas of the downtown Calgary skyline. The station was not included in the city's 2017 recommendations for the Green Line. On May 12, 2020, the City of Calgary announced the addition of the station, bringing the total number of stations in stage one to 15, and the total number of stations on the full Green Line to 29.

References 

CTrain stations
Railway stations scheduled to open in 2027